Johnston Square is a neighborhood in central Baltimore, Maryland located east of the Fallsway and west of the Oliver neighborhood, bordered by Greenmount Cemetery at the north and Eager Street at the south. 

The neighborhood is erroneously listed by a number of real estate websites as "Johnson Square."  The sites also erroneously list the Western border of the neighborhood as Hunter Street. The area bordered by Hunter Street to the West and I-83 to the East is actually more closely associated with the Mt. Vernon and Belvedere neighborhoods, two areas with some of the city's highest incomes and lowest crime rates. 

The neighborhood contains Johnston Square Elementary School and two parks, Johnston Square Park and Ambrose Kennedy Park. It is one of five neighborhoods whose Urban Renewal Plans are included in the East Baltimore Revitalization Plan. The neighborhood contains portions of the Baltimore City Correctional Facilities and its residents are mostly low income African-American families. It has been used as a filming location on the HBO drama The Wire.

References

External links
Johnston Square Profile at Live Baltimore
Johnston Square Elementary School
Johnston Square Urban Renewal Plan

African-American history in Baltimore
East Baltimore
Public housing in Baltimore
Working-class culture in Baltimore